The 2020 New Progressive Party primaries was the primary elections by which voters of the New Progressive Party (PNP) chose its nominees for various political offices of Puerto Rico for 2020. The primaries, originally scheduled for June 2020, were delayed until August 9, 2020, due to the COVID-19 pandemic. The August 9 elections, however, were marred by a lack of ballots leading a suspension of the election; polling locations that could not open on August 9 were scheduled to be open for voting on August 16. The winner for the party's nomination for Governor of Puerto Rico is Pedro Pierluisi, former Resident Commissioner of Puerto Rico and acting Governor after Ricardo Rosselló's resignation, over incumbent Governor Wanda Vázquez Garced.

Candidates

Governor
 Wanda Vázquez Garced, incumbent Governor
 Pedro Pierluisi, former Resident Commissioner of Puerto Rico

Resident Commissioner
 Jenniffer González, incumbent Resident Commissioner

Senate
The PNP holds 21 seats in the Senate of Puerto Rico, 6 at-large seats and 15 district seats.

House of Representatives
The PNP holds 34 seats in the House of Representatives of Puerto Rico.

See also
 2020 Popular Democratic Party of Puerto Rico primaries

References

External links
 Comisión Estatal de Elecciones

Primary elections in Puerto Rico
PNP
New Progressive Party (Puerto Rico)